Beverbach is a river of North Rhine-Westphalia, Germany.

The Beverbach springs south of Aachen. It is a right tributary of the Wurm in  Aachen.

See also
List of rivers of North Rhine-Westphalia

References

Rivers of North Rhine-Westphalia
Rivers of Germany